Aspergillus flavescens is a rare species of fungus in the genus Aspergillus. Aspergillus flavescens can cause Myringomycosis.

References

Further reading
 
 
 
 
 
 
 

 

flavescens
Fungi described in 1867